Notanthera is a monotypic genus of flowering plants belonging to the family Loranthaceae. The only species is Notanthera heterophyllus.

Its native range is Juan Fernández Islands, Central and Southern Chile.

References

Loranthaceae
Loranthaceae genera
Monotypic Santalales genera